Victoria Rodríguez Arralde (born December 5, 1972) is an Uruguayan actress, presenter, artist, translator and television figure. She is known for hosting Esta Boca es mía, a talk show broadcast by Canal 12, since 2008.

Biography 
Rodríguez attended Ivy Thomas Memorial School and then John XXIII Institute. In 1993 she began her activity as a television figure, hosting Oxígeno and later the program Los Viajes del Doce. In 2009 she debuted as an actress, playing the Uruguayan poet Juana de Ibarborou. That year he began to lead the new debate program, Esta boca es mía, formed by a panel and where current issues are discussed.

She is also a painter.

Acting career

Theatre

Television

Accolades 
Rodríguez has won the Iris Award for Best Female Presenter twice, in 2014 and 2017, in that year she also won the Golden Iris Award.

References 

Uruguayan actresses
Uruguayan television presenters
Uruguayan women television presenters
Uruguayan stage actresses
Uruguayan women artists
Uruguayan translators
1972 births
Living people
People educated at Ivy Thomas Memorial School